Rüdiger Schaper (born 1959) is a German writer, journalist and theatre critic.

Life 
Born in Worms, Schaper lives and works mainly in Berlin and has worked at Der Tagesspiegel since 1999. There he is head of the feuilleton department. He previously was the Berlin cultural correspondent of the Süddeutsche Zeitung.

Works 
Essays and cultural history play an important role in Schaper's writing. He published biographies of Harald Juhnke, Constantine Simonides, Karl May and Alexander von Humboldt. His book on theatre history lists above all those theatre-makers who have meant a great deal to him as a critic.

 Spektakel: Eine Geschichte des Theaters von Schlingensief bis Aischylos. , Munich 2014, .
 Karl May: Untertan, Hochstapler, Übermensch. Siedler Verlag, Munich 2011, .
 Die Odyssee des Fälschers. Siedler Verlag, Munich 2011, .
 Der Entertainer der Nation. Harald Juhnke. Zwischen Glamour und Gosse. Argon Verlag, 1997, .
 Berlin um Mitternacht. Argon Verlag, Munich 1998, .
 Alexander von Humboldt: Der Preuße und die neuen Welten. Siedler Verlag, Munich 2018, .
 Elefanten. Ein Portrait. Matthes & Seitz, Berlin 2020, .

References

External links 
 
 Text-Profil von R. Schaper beim Tagesspiegel

German theatre critics
20th-century German journalists
21st-century German journalists
Print journalists
Der Tagesspiegel people
1959 births
Living people
People from Worms, Germany